Moment of Glory is an album by German hard rock band Scorpions. It was recorded in collaboration with the Berlin Philharmonic Orchestra and released in 2000. The album features re-arranged songs from the Scorpions repertoire, as well as classical interludes, a cover song and the new single "Moment of Glory". Initially, English composer Andrew Powell was asked to provide arrangements and Michael Kamen was designated next for the orchestral material. After the latter gave up the job in order to work with Metallica for their album S&M, finally the Austrian arranger and conductor Christian Kolonovits proved to be the right collaborator.

Live performances 
The Moment of Glory concert programme was first presented at the Hannover EXPO in June 2000, with Christian Kolonovits conducting the Berlin Philharmonic. The live performance was filmed to be released in VHS and Video CD in December 2000. In 2001, this rock-symphonic show was taken on a seven-city tour to Russia and the Baltic countries. Christian Kolonovits and Scott Lawton alternated as orchestra conductors.

Track notes 
"Hurricane 2000", the reworking of "Rock You Like a Hurricane", was the official theme song to Sabres Hockey Network broadcasts.

The title track "Moment of Glory" was the official anthem of the EXPO 2000 in Hannover, Germany.

The instrumental "Deadly Sting Suite" is based on two earlier Scorpions tracks, "He's a Woman, She's a Man" and "Dynamite".

The fifth track "Crossfire" repeats the main theme of the Russian song "Moscow Nights".

"Here in My Heart", written by Diane Warren, was recorded by Tiffany 10 years earlier for her album New Inside.

The 5.1 surround mix on the SACD release includes an orchestra-only version of "Wind of Change" as a ghost track, which follows after approximately one minute of silence at the end of "Lady Starlight".

Track listings

Album

Video

Personnel

Scorpions
 Klaus Meine – lead vocals
 Matthias Jabs – lead guitar, backing vocals
 Rudolf Schenker – rhythm guitar, backing vocals
 Ralph Rieckermann – bass, backing vocals (on video version only)
 James Kottak – drums, backing vocals
 The Berlin Philharmonic Orchestra

Guest musicians on CD
 Lyn Liechty – vocals on "Here in My Heart"
 Ray Wilson – vocals on "Big City Nights"
 Zucchero – vocals on "Send Me an Angel"
 Guenther Becker - sitar on "Lady Starlight"
 Ken Taylor – bass
 Stefan Schrupp - drum and computer programming
 Gumpoldtskirchener Spatzen, Vienna - children's choir on "Moment of Glory"
 Vince Pirillo, Kai Petersen, Michael Perfler - choir on "Moment of Glory"
 Susie Webb, Zoë Nicholas, Rita Campbell, Melanie Marshall - backing vocals

Guest musicians on VHS
 Lyn Liechty – vocals on "Here in My Heart"
 Ray Wilson – vocals on "Big City Nights"

CD production
Christian Kolonovits - producer, arrangements, conductor
Hartmut Pfannmüller - engineer, mixing
Joerg Steinfad, Martin Boehm, Rory Kushnen, Gert Jacobs, Mirko Bezzi - engineers
Ian Cooper - mastering

Charts

Weekly charts

Year-end charts

Singles

Certifications

References

External links
 Official album page
 Official DVD page
 "Moment of Glory" video
 "Hurricane 2000" video
 "Here in My Heart" video

2000 albums
Scorpions (band) albums
EMI Classics albums
2000 video albums
Scorpions (band) video albums
Live video albums